Berlin, Kapstadt, Prag is the seventh studio album by German recording artist Annett Louisan, released by Columbia Records on 13 May 2016 in German-speaking Europe. Conceived amid the recording of Louisan's follow-up to her 2014 album Zu viel Information, conception of the album was motivated by her appearance on the reality television series Sing meinen Song (2016), the German version of The Best Singers series, for which Louisan had reworked several original songs. A breakaway from the chanson genre on her previous albums, recording of Louisan's pop renditions took place in Prague.

Track listing

Charts

Release history

References

External links
 

2016 albums
Covers albums